Rabbit Foot Lodge is a historic house at 3600 Silent Grove Road in Springdale, Arkansas. A distinctive combination of Ozark and Adirondack styling, it architecturally resembles an American Foursquare house, with a distinctive roofline that includes pyramidal elements with flared eaves. Exterior walls were joined with large spikes, while the interior walls were joined to the exterior ones with mortise and tenon joints. When the house was built it received immediate notice in architectural and popular circles. It was owned for a time by Arkansas politician J. William Fulbright.

See also
National Register of Historic Places listings in Washington County, Arkansas

References

External links
Encyclopedia of Arkansas History & Culture entry

Houses on the National Register of Historic Places in Arkansas
Houses completed in 1908
Houses in Washington County, Arkansas
National Register of Historic Places in Washington County, Arkansas
Buildings and structures in Springdale, Arkansas
1908 establishments in Arkansas
Log buildings and structures on the National Register of Historic Places in Arkansas
Log houses in the United States
Rustic architecture in Arkansas